Heliogomphus ceylonicus is a species of dragonfly in the family Gomphidae. It is endemic to Sri Lanka. Its natural habitats are subtropical or tropical moist lowland forests and rivers. It is threatened by habitat loss.

Sources

Dragonflies of Sri Lanka
Gomphidae
Taxonomy articles created by Polbot
Insects described in 1878
Taxobox binomials not recognized by IUCN